Alain Bocquet (born 6 May 1946) is a French politician.

A member of the French Communist Party (PCF), he was a Deputy from the Nord department of France between 1978 and 2017 and president of the communist parliamentary group from 1993 to 2007. He served as part of the regional council of Nord-Pas-de-Calais from 1992 to 1998 and has been mayor of Saint-Amand-les-Eaux since 1995.

Biography 
Bocquet was born in Marquillies in 1946. Before going into politics, he was a social worker. His younger brother, Éric Bocquet, is also a politician, and in 2016 they published a book together about tax evasion and fraud, Sans domicile fisc.

Summary of mandates

National mandates 

 3 April 1978 — 1 April 1986: Deputy of the Nord's 19th constituency.
 2 April 1986 — 14 May 1988: Deputy from the Nord (proportional representation).
 12 June 1988 — 20 June 2017: Deputy of the Nord's 20th constituency.

Local mandates 

 21 March 1977 — 13 March 1983: Deputy mayor of Lille.
 14 March 983 — 12 March 1989: Municipal councillor of Valenciennes. 
 23 March 1992 — 15 March 1998: Regional councillor of Nord-Pas-de-Calais.
 Since 25 June 1995: Mayor of Saint-Amand-les-Eaux.
 22 December 2000 — 11 July 2020: President of the communauté d'agglomération de la Porte du Hainaut.

References

1946 births
Living people
People from Nord (French department)
French Communist Party politicians
Deputies of the 12th National Assembly of the French Fifth Republic
Deputies of the 13th National Assembly of the French Fifth Republic
Deputies of the 14th National Assembly of the French Fifth Republic